Monagas is a state of Venezuela.

Monagas may also refer to:

 Monagas (surname), including a list of people with the name
 José Gregorio Monagas Municipality, Anzoátegui State, Venezuela
 José Tadeo Monagas Municipality, Guarico State, Venezuela
 Monagas Sport Club, a Venezuelan football team

See also

 Parque Familiar Julio Enrique Monagas, Puerto Rico